Irish coffee is a caffeinated alcoholic drink consisting of Irish whiskey, hot coffee and sugar, which has been stirred and topped with cream (sometimes cream liqueur). The coffee is drunk through the cream.

Origin
Different variations of coffee cocktails pre-date the now-classic Irish coffee by at least 100 years. 

From the mid-19th century, the Pharisäer and the Fiaker were served in Viennese coffee houses; both were coffee cocktails served in glass, topped with whipped cream. The former was also known in northern Germany and Denmark around that time. Around 1900, the coffee cocktail menu in the Viennese cafés also included Kaisermelange, Maria Theresia, Biedermeier-Kaffee and a handful of other variations on the theme.

In 19th-century France, a mixture of coffee and spirits was called a gloria.

 "" (Balzac, Le Père Goriot, 1834, I.)
 "" (Flaubert, Madame Bovary, 1857.)

Several places claim to have developed the modern recipe in the 1950s. One version is attributed to a Joe Sheridan, head chef at the restaurant and coffee shop in the Foynes Airbase flying boat terminal (about 15km from present-day Shannon Airport, County Clare). In 1942 or 1943 he added whiskey to the coffee of some disembarking passengers.

Stanton Delaplane, a travel writer for the San Francisco Chronicle, maintains he brought Irish coffee to the United States after drinking it at Shannon Airport.  His version is that he worked with the Buena Vista Cafe in San Francisco to start serving it on November 10, 1952.  Sheridan later emigrated to work at the Buena Vista Cafe.

Preparation

Irish whiskey and at least one level teaspoon of sugar are poured over black coffee and stirred in until fully dissolved. Thick cream is carefully poured over the back of a spoon initially held just above the surface of the coffee and gradually raised a little until the entire layer is floated.

Variations 

In 1988, the National Standards Authority of Ireland published Irish Standard I.S. 417: Irish Coffee. The standard has been cancelled at least as of 2020.

Although whiskey, coffee and cream are the basic ingredients in all Irish coffee, there are variations in preparation: the choice of coffee and the methods used for brewing it differ significantly. The use of espresso machines or fully automatic coffee brewers is now typical: the coffee is either a caffè americano (espresso diluted with hot water) or some kind of filter coffee, often made using a coffee capsule.

The cream used in some bars to make what is sold as "Irish coffee" is sometimes sprayed from a can. Some bartenders gently shake fresh cream to achieve a smooth layer on top of the coffee.

In Spain, Irish coffee (café irlandés) is sometimes served with a bottom layer of whiskey, a separate coffee layer, and a layer of cream on top; special devices are sold for making it.

Some bars in Southeast Asia serve a cocktail of iced coffee and whiskey, sometimes without cream, under the name "Irish coffee".

Many drinks of hot coffee with a distilled spirit, and cream floated on top—liqueur coffees—are given names derived from Irish coffee, although the names are not standardised. Irish cream coffee (also known as Baileys coffee) can be considered a variant of Irish coffee, but involves the use of Irish cream as a "pre-mixed" substitute for the whisky, cream and sugar. Jamaican coffee would be expected to be made with rum; Highland coffee, also called Gaelic coffee, with Scotch whisky; Russian coffee with vodka; Mexican coffee with tequila, and so on, and so forth.

See also 

 Rüdesheimer Kaffee
 List of coffee drinks
 List of hot beverages

Notes

References

External links 

 
 

Alcoholic coffee drinks
Cocktails with whisky
Irish alcoholic drinks